Tillandsia dasyliriifolia is a species of flowering plant in the Bromeliaceae family. This species is native to eastern and southern Mexico (from Chiapas north to San Luis Potosí), Belize, and Isla de Providencia (an island in the Caribbean east of Nicaragua, governed by Colombia).

References

dasyliriifolia
Flora of Mexico
Flora of Belize
Providencia Island, Colombia
Flora of Colombia
Plants described in 1887
Taxa named by John Gilbert Baker